The 1974 New Zealand rugby union tour of Ireland, Wales and England was a series of eight matches played by the New Zealand national rugby union team (the All Blacks) in November 1974.

The tour formed part of the celebrations of the centenary of the Irish Rugby Football Union and six of the eight matches were played in Ireland, culminating in the international against the Ireland national rugby union team. The tourists then moved to Wales to play a team designated 'A Welsh XV' but which was in fact a full-strength Wales team. Although neither Wales nor New Zealand awarded caps for the match it was a full international in all but name and attracted a crowd of 50,000 to Cardiff Arms Park for a midweek afternoon match. The final fixture was against the Barbarians who selected the entire pack of forwards who had played in the test matches on that year's 1974 British Lions tour to South Africa. The Barbarians held the All Blacks to a 13–13 draw and prevented them from completing a clean sweep by winning all eight matches on tour.

This was the first time that the All Blacks had undertaken a short tour to Europe. On each of the seven previous All Black tours the tourists had played at least fifteen fixtures and at least four full international matches.

Matches
Scores and results list New Zealand's points tally first.

References

 http://stats.allblacks.com/asp/tourbreak.asp?IDID=71

Bibliography

1974 rugby union tours
1974
1974
1974
1974
1974 in New Zealand rugby union
1974–75 in Irish rugby union
1974–75 in English rugby union
1974–75 in Welsh rugby union
1974–75 in European rugby union